Nervous Breakdown is the second and final studio album by American hip hop group Fu-Schnickens. It was released October 25, 1994, via Jive Records. Production was handled by Rod 'KP' Kirkpatrick, Diamond D, K-Cut, Jim Nice and Lyvio G. The album peaked at number eighty-one on the Billboard 200 chart.

Release and reception

Nervous Breakdown peaked at eighty-one on the U.S. Billboard 200 and reached the nineteenth spot on the Top R&B/Hip-Hop Albums chart. In a contemporary review for The Village Voice, Robert Christgau wrote:

Bret Love at AllMusic wrote in retrospect that Nervous Breakdown showcased "an improved lyrical maturity among all three members" on a record that was "a frenzied, fast-paced roller coaster ride of originality that doesn't let up until the last song ends."

Track listing

Sample credits
Track 1 contains a sample of "Dance Floor" written by Roger Troutman and Larry Troutman and performed by Roger Troutman.
Track 2 contains a sample of "The Show" written by Richard Walters and D. Smith and performed by Slick Rick.
Track 3 contains a sample of "Crooklyn" written by Jonathan Davis, Ali Shaheed Muhammad, Kenyatta Blake, Duval Clear and Edward Archer and performed by The Crooklyn Dodgers.
Track 7 contains a sample of "Hittin' Switches" written and performed by Erick Sermon.
Track 11 contains a sample of "(Not Just) Knee Deep" written by Geroge Clinton, Jr. and Philippé Wynne and performed by Funkadelic, and "360 Degrees" written and performed by Maxwell "Grand Puba" Dixon.

Personnel

Roderick "Chip Fu" Roachford – main artist
Lennox "Poc Fu" Maturine – main artist
Joseph "Moc Fu" Jones – main artist
Shaquille O'Neal – featured artist (track 10)
Rod 'KP' Kirkpatrick – producer (tracks: 1, 3, 7, 9, 11), mixing (track 7), re-mixing (track 11)
Kevin "K-Cut" McKenzie – producer (tracks: 2, 10), mixing (track 10)
J. "Jim Nice" Fields – producer (track 4)
Joseph "Diamond D" Kirkland – producer (tracks: 5, 6)
Lyvio R. Gay – producer (track 8)
Kerry Crafton – recording (tracks: 1, 3, 9)
Steve Neat – recording (tracks: 1, 3, 5, 8, 9)
Ron Allaire – mixing (tracks: 1-5, 9), recording (track 5)
Adam Kudzin – recording (tracks: 2, 4, 5, 7, 8), engineering assistant (track 6), mixing (track 7)
Chris Trevett – recording (track 2), mixing (track 6)
Tim Latham – recording (tracks: 2, 6)
Tony Smalios – recording (track 8)
Troy Hightower – mixing (track 8)
Anthony Saunders – recording (track 10)
Gary Platt – recording (track 10)
Gary Glugston – mixing (track 10)
Rick Rooney – re-mixing (track 11)
Tony Dawsey – mastering
Carolyn Quan – design
Carl Posey – photography

Charts

References

External links

1994 albums
Albums produced by Diamond D
Albums produced by K-Cut (producer)
Fu-Schnickens albums
Jive Records albums